Makloor is a village and a Mandal in Nizamabad district in the state of Telangana in India.It is 10 km from Nizamabad.

References 

Villages in Nizamabad district
Mandals in Nizamabad district